A bombsite is the wreckage that remains after a bomb has destroyed a building or other structure.

World War II bombsites
After World War II many European cities remained severely damaged from bombing. London and other British cities which had suffered the Blitz were pock-marked with bombsites, vacant lots covered in the rubble of destroyed buildings. Many postwar children in urban areas shared a common memory of playing their games and riding their bicycles across these desolate environments.  There were often abandoned bombshelters of the 'Anderson' type nearby.

In London, Liverpool, Bristol, etc., across the channel in Berlin and other places these sites were constant reminders of the death and destruction of the war. This was a contributory factor to the European psycho-sociological outlook of the 1950s and 1960s.  The German city of Dresden suffered a previously unprecedented level of destruction.

In literature and media
The rubble of Viennese bombsites and the remnants of the city's battered infrastructure serve as a backdrop to much of the action in the movie The Third Man, written by Graham Greene, an author who would return to this bombsite motif again in his 1954 short story "The Destructors".

See also

 Aerial bombing of cities
 Urban renewal
 Air-raid shelter

References

External links
 Photograph: Bristol's last Bomb Site
 London Discovery Tours offers walks around the London bomb sites
 Photograph: Open spaces in Portsmouth where bombs had fallen
 Photographs: World War 2 Bomb Sites
 On Google Maps: V2 sites in Walthamstow
 Summary of 'The Destructors' by Graham Greene (from litsum.com)
 Summary of 'The Destructors' by Graham Greene (from enotes.com)
 Other essays analysing Graham Greene's 'The Destructors'
 Images of London bomb damage and related material
 The Psychological effects of war and violence on children  By Lewis A. Leavitt, Nathan A. Fox on Google Books

Further reading
 
 
 
 
 

History of Europe
Urban planning
Aftermath of World War II
Bombs